Azhar Bin Ahmad is a Malaysian Politician who is the Member of the Dewan Negara appointed by the Yang di-Pertuan Agong since 21 March 2022. He is associated with the Barisan Nasional Party.

He is Head of Capital Market Department, Investment Division in IJM Corporation Berhad. 

He is a Member of the Pharmaniaga Board.

References 

Members of the Dewan Negara
Year of birth missing (living people)
Living people